Heinrich Barlage (6 December 1891 – 18 April 1968) was a German politician of the Christian Democratic Union (CDU) and former member of the German Bundestag.

Life 
Barlage was elected to the council of Altendorf in 1923 and was a member of the council of the town of Nordhorn from 1929 to 1943. In 1930, the centre member was elected to the county committee of the Grafschafter Kreisausschuss (county council) on the basis of an election proposal from the centre and the SPD.

From 1953 to 1957 he was a member of the German Bundestag. He entered the Bundestag as a directly elected member of the Emsland constituency.

Literature

References

1891 births
1968 deaths
Members of the Bundestag for Lower Saxony
Members of the Bundestag 1953–1957
Members of the Bundestag for the Christian Democratic Union of Germany